Frank Ruskey is a combinatorialist and computer scientist, and professor at the University of Victoria. His research involves algorithms for exhaustively listing discrete structures, combinatorial Gray codes, Venn and Euler diagrams, combinatorics on words, and enumerative combinatorics.  Frank Ruskey is the author of the Combinatorial Object Server (COS), a website for information on and generation of combinatorial objects.

Selected publications

References

External links
 Frank Ruskey's homepage
 Combinatorial Object Server
  on combinatorics
 

Combinatorialists
Academic staff of the University of Victoria
University of California, San Diego alumni
Canadian computer scientists
Canadian mathematicians
Living people
Place of birth missing (living people)
Year of birth missing (living people)